The Hotel Beaumont in Beaumont, Texas was built in 1922 by a group of 277 investors. One million dollars was spent to build the structure. The building is 11 stories tall, and has 250 rooms. The building contains two ballrooms, the Rose Room, and the Sky Room on the Roof, both of which were used many times during the structure's colorful history.  It is on Orleans Street near Pearl Street (U.S. Route 90).

The building was used as a retirement community from 1977–2011. A full restoration of the building was completed in 2000, excluding the Rose Room and the Sky Room.

Since its auction in 2014, the hotel still sits abandoned.

See also

National Register of Historic Places listings in Jefferson County, Texas

References

External links

Hotel buildings completed in 1922
Buildings and structures in Beaumont, Texas
Beaux-Arts architecture in Texas
Hotels in Texas
Hotel buildings on the National Register of Historic Places in Texas
Historic district contributing properties in Texas
National Register of Historic Places in Jefferson County, Texas